Mukham is a 1990 Indian Malayalam-language thriller film co-written and directed by Mohan, starring Mohanlal, Nassar and Ranjini in the lead roles. The film does not have any songs, but features a musical score composed by Johnson. It is considered one of the best murder mystery movies in Malayalam but didn't do well in boxoffice.

Plot
The film is about a police officer who tries to uncover and stop an unknown serial killer who has sniped three victims and plans for the fourth one.

Cast
 Mohanlal as ACP Hariprasad IPS
 Ranjini as Usha
 Nassar as Comm. P. N. Narendran IPS
 Priya as Prema
 Bindhya as Nirmala
 Sukumaran as DySP Minnal Madhavan
 Sankaradi as Kesavan Nair
 Vijay Menon as Vijay
 Soman as Home Minister
 Innocent as Anthony
 Mala Aravindan as Agasthy
 Ravi Menon as Kunjikrishnan
 Valsala Menon as Usha's Mother
 Shivaji as CI Narayana Swamy
 T. P. Madhavan as Usha's Father
 Kundara Johnny as Menon
 Anderson as Alexander
 Rajan Sankaradi as George
 Joseph Madapally in Cameo Appearance
 Rajeevnath in Cameo Appearance
 Ramyasree in Cameo Appearance

References

External links
 
 Mukham on Amazon Prime Video
 

1990 films
1990s Malayalam-language films
1990 thriller films
Films directed by Mohan
Indian thriller films